Kolby is a former parish of the Church of Denmark on Samsø island.

In 2004, it had 550 inhabitants, 492 of them being members of the church.

In 2014, all parishes on that island have been merged in one.

References 

Church of Denmark
Samsø
Samsø Municipality